The women's team modern pentathlon competition at the 2010 Asian Games in Guangzhou was held on 23 November 2010.

Schedule
All times are China Standard Time (UTC+08:00)

Results

References

Results

External links
Official website

Modern pentathlon at the 2010 Asian Games